This is a complete list of recordings by the Los Angeles Philharmonic, shown alphabetically by conductor, and then by recording label.

John Adams

DG Concerts — recorded live at Walt Disney Concert Hall
Adams:  The Dharma at Big Sur (Leila Josefowicz, electric violin) (world premiere recording)
Kraft: Timpani Concerto No. 1 (Joseph Pereira, timpani)
Rosenman:  Suite from Rebel Without a Cause

Stefan Asbury

DG Concerts  — recorded live at Walt Disney Concert Hall
Reich: Tehillim (with Synergy Vocals)
Reich: Three Movements for Orchestra
Reich: Variations for Winds, Strings and Keyboard

Leonard Bernstein

Deutsche Grammophon
Barber: Adagio for Strings
Bernstein: Overture to Candide
Bernstein: Symphonic Dances from West Side Story
Copland: Appalachian Spring
Donizetti: Messa di Requiem (Recorded live at the Dorothy Chandler Pavilion) (Katia Ricciarelli, soprano; Agnes Baltsa, mezzo-soprano; Plácido Domingo, tenor; Samuel Ramey, bass; Robert Lloyd, bass; Los Angeles Master Chorale)
Gershwin: Rhapsody in Blue (Leonard Bernstein, piano)
William Schuman: American Festival Overture

Andrey Boreyko

Yarlung Records
Lutosławski:  Chain II (Martin Chalifour, violin)

Fritz Busch

Guild
Beethoven: Overture, "Egmont", Op. 84
Schubert: Dance Suite for Orchestra (arr. Busch)
Wagner:  Prelude and Interlude from Die Meistersinger von Nürnberg, Act III
Wagner: Prelude and Liebestodt from Tristan und Isolde

Aaron Copland

Naxos
Copland:  El Salón México
Copland:  Clarinet Concerto (Benny Goodman, clarinet)
Copland:  Fanfare for the Common Man
Copland:  Suite, Appalachian Spring
Copland:  Suite from The Tender Land (Los Angeles Master Chorale: Roger Wagner, Music Director)

Gustavo Dudamel

Deutsche Grammophon
Adams:  The Gospel According to the Other Mary (Kelley O'Connor and Tamara Mumford, mezzo-soprano; Brian Cummings, Daniel Bubeck, Nathan Medley, counter-tenors; Russell Thomas, tenor; Los Angeles Master Chorale) (world premiere recording)
Adams:  Must the Devil Have All the Good Tunes? (Yuja Wang, piano) (world premiere recording)
Ives:  Symphony No. 1
Ives:  Symphony No. 2
Ives:  Symphony No. 3, "The Camp Meeting"
Ives:  Symphony No. 4
Mahler:  Symphony No. 8
Mahler:  Symphony No. 9
Norman:  Sustain (world premiere recording)  
Tchaikovsky:  The Nutcracker (complete ballet score)
Verdi:  Messa da Requiem (Julianna Di Giacomo, soprano; Michelle DeYoung, mezzo-soprano; Vittorio Grigolo, tenor; Ildebrando D'Arcangelo, bass; Los Angeles Master Chorale)
Williams:  "Fawkes The Phoenix" from Harry Potter and the Chamber of Secrets
Williams:  "Harry's Wondrous World" from Harry Potter and the Philosopher's Stone
Williams:  "Hedwig's Theme" from Harry Potter and the Philosopher's Stone
Williams:  "The Flight to Neverland" from Hook
Williams:  "Out to Sea"/"The Shark Cage Fugue" from Jaws
Williams:  Adagio from Star Wars: The Force Awakens
Williams:  Excerpts from Close Encounters of the Third Kind
Williams:  The Imperial March from The Empire Strikes Back
Williams:  Marion's Theme from Raiders of the Lost Ark
Williams:  Olympic Fanfare and Theme
Williams:  The Raiders March from Raiders of the Lost Ark
Williams:  Sayuri's Theme from Memoirs of a Geisha
Williams:  Scherzo For Motorcycle And Orchestra from Indiana Jones And The Last Crusade
Williams:  Superman's March from Superman
Williams:  Theme from Jurassic Park
Williams:  Theme from Schindler's List (Simone Porter, violin)
Williams:  Throne Room and Finale from Star Wars
Williams:  Yoda's Theme from The Empire Strikes Back

DG Concerts — recorded live at Walt Disney Concert Hall
Adams:  City Noir (Carrie Dennis, viola; Timothy McAllister, alto saxophone; William Lane, horn; Donald Green, trumpet; James Miller, trombone) (world premiere recording)
Adams:  Slonimsky's Earbox
Bartók:  Concerto for Orchestra
Berlioz:  Symphonie fantastique
Bernstein:  Symphony No. 1, Jeremiah (Kelley O'Connor, mezzo-soprano)
Brahms:  Symphony No. 4
Debussy: La Mer
Donizetti:  La fille du régiment, "Ah mes amis"  (Juan Diego Flórez, tenor)
Granda (arr. Flórez): "La flor de la canela"  (Juan Diego Flórez, tenor)	
Grever:  Júrame (Todos dicenques...)  (Juan Diego Flórez, tenor)
Gutierrez (arr. Pena):  Alma llanera  (Juan Diego Flórez, tenor)
Lara (arr. Guinovart):  "Granada"  (Juan Diego Flórez, tenor)
Mahler:  Symphony No. 1
Márquez:  Danzón no. 2
Moncayo: Huapango
Rossini:  Overture, La gazza ladra
Rossini:  La Cenerentola, "Principe più non se"  (Juan Diego Flórez, tenor)	
Rossini:  Overture, Semiramide
Rossini:  Semiramide, "La speranza più soave"  (Juan Diego Flórez, tenor)
Stravinsky: The Firebird (complete ballet)
Verdi:  Rigoletto, "La donna è mobile"  (Juan Diego Flórez, tenor)

OMM
Philip Glass: Double Piano Concerto (Katia & Marielle Labéque, Piano) Only at iTunes

Christoph Eschenbach

DG Concerts — recorded live at Walt Disney Concert Hall
Dvořák: Carnival Overture, Op. 92
Dvořák: Symphony No. 9, Op. 95: "From the New World"

Lawrence Foster

New World Records
Weiss: American Life

Twentieth Century Fox
Soundtrack from the film The Turning Point

Carlo Maria Giulini

Deutsche Grammophon
Beethoven: Symphony No. 3, "Eroica"
Beethoven: Symphony No. 5
Beethoven: Symphony No. 6
Bizet:  Carmen, "La fleur que tu m’avais jetee" (Plácido Domingo, tenor)
Bizet:  Les pêcheurs de perles, "Je crois entendre encore" (Plácido Domingo, tenor)
Brahms: Symphony No. 1
Brahms: Symphony No. 2
Chopin:  Andante spianato and Grande Polonaise for piano & orchestra, Opus 22 (Krystian Zimerman, piano)
Chopin: Piano Concerto No. 1 (Krystian Zimerman, piano)
Chopin: Piano Concerto No. 2 (Krystian Zimerman, piano)
Debussy: La Mer
Donizetti:  L'elisir d'amore, "Una furtive lagrima" (Plácido Domingo, tenor; Roger Wagner Chorale)
Donizetti:  Lucia di Lammermoor, "Tombe degl’avi miei" – "Fra poco a me ricovero" (Plácido Domingo, tenor)
Flotow:  Martha, "Ach, so fromm" (Plácido Domingo, tenor)
Halevy:  La Juive, "Rachel, quand du Seigneur la grace tutelaire" (Plácido Domingo, tenor)
Meyerbeer:  L'Africaine, "Pays merveilleux . . . O paradis"  (Plácido Domingo, tenor)
Ravel:  Ma Mère l'Oye
Ravel:  Rapsodie espagnole
Respighi:  Roman Festivals
Schumann: Manfred Overture
Schumann: Symphony No. 3, "Rhenish"
Strauss:  Don Juan
Tchaikovsky: Symphony No. 6, "Pathétique"
Verdi:  Aida, "Se quell guerrier io fossi!" – "Celeste Aida" (Plácido Domingo, tenor)
Verdi:  Don Carlo, "Fontainebleau!  Foresta immense e solitaria!" (Plácido Domingo, tenor)
Verdi:  Ernani, "Merce, kiletti amici . . . Come rugiada al cespite" (Plácido Domingo, tenor)
Verdi: Falstaff (Complete Opera.  Recorded live at the Dorothy Chandler Pavilion) (Renato Bruson, Katia Ricciarelli, Lucia Valentini-Terrani, Barbara Hendricks, Brenda Boozer, Dalmacio Gonzalez, Leo Nucci, Francis Egerton, William Wildermann, and the Los Angeles Master Chorale)
Verdi:  Il trovatore, "Ah si, ben mio . . . l'onda de-suoni mistici . . . Di quella";  (Plácido Domingo, tenor; Roger Wagner Chorale)

John Harbison

New World Records
Harbison: The Natural World (Janice Felty, mezzo-soprano)

Herbert von Karajan

Pristine Audio (recorded live at the Hollywood Bowl, 2 July 1959)
Ives:  The Unanswered Question
Mozart:  Symphony No. 35 in D major, K. 385 – "Haffner"
  Smith/Key:  "The Star-Spangled Banner"
Richard Strauss:  Ein Heldenleben, Op. 40 (David Frisina, Violin)
Wagner:  Overture, Die Meistersinger von Nürnberg

Otto Klemperer

Historical recordings appearing on multiple labels (Archipel Records, archiphon, Deutsche Grammophon, Grammofono 2000)
Bach:  Air, from Suite for Orchestra No. 3, BWV 1068
Beethoven:  Symphony No. 5 in C minor
Berlioz:  Overture, Benvenuto Cellini, H. 76b (Op. 23)
Brahms:  Piano Quartet in G minor, op.25 (orch. Arnold Schoenberg)
Corelli:  "La Folia" from Op. 5, No. 12 (Orchestral Version) (Joseph Szigeti, violin)
Debussy: Prélude à l'après-midi d'un faune (Anthony Linden, flute)
Gershwin:  Second Prelude for Piano (orchestrated by David Broekman) (George Gershwin Memorial Concert, Aug 8, 1937)
Liszt: Totentatz for piano and orchestra (Bernardo Segall, piano)
Mozart:  Symphony No. 35 in D major, K. 385 – "Haffner"
Puccini:  La Bohème: "Che gelida manina"; "Mi chiamano Mimi"; "O soave fanciulla" (Lucrezia Bori, soprano; Joseph Bentonelli, tenor)
Schoenberg:  Quartet Concerto (after Handel, concerto grosso Op. 6 No. 7) (with Kolisch Quartet)
Johann Strauss, Jr.:  Overture, Die Fledermaus
Richard Strauss:  Don Juan
Richard Strauss:  Till Eulenspiegels lustige Streiche (Till Eulenspiegel's Merry Pranks), tone poem for orchestra, Op. 28 (TrV 171)
Thomas:  Overture, Mignon
Verdi:  Overture, I Vespri Siciliani
Wagner:  Overture, Die Meistersinger von Nürnberg

Sergei Koussevitzky

Iron Needle (live at the Hollywood Bowl:  August 1948)
Rachmaninov:  Piano Concerto No. 3, Op. 30 (Vladimir Horowitz, piano)

Rockport Records (live at the Hollywood Bowl: Sept 3, 1949)
Prokofiev: Symphony No. 1 in D major, Op. 25 – "Classical"
Rachmaninov: Piano Concerto No. 2 in C Minor, Op. 18 (Artur Rubinstein, piano)

Reinbert de Leeuw

DG Concerts — recorded live at Walt Disney Concert Hall
Andriessen: Racconto Dall'Inferno
Andriessen: de Staat
Pärt: Tabula Rasa

Nonesuch
Andriessen:  Theatre of the World

Erich Leinsdorf

EMI Classics/Seraphim
Debussy:  La Mer
Dvořák: Symphony No. 9, "From the New World"
Grieg: Piano Concerto (Leonard Pennario, piano)
Rachmaninov:  Rhapsody on a Theme of Paganini, Op. 43 (Leonard Pennario, piano)
Ravel: Daphnis and Chloé, Suite No. 2
Strauss: Death and Transfiguration
Tchaikovsky: Piano Concerto No. 1 (Leonard Pennario, piano)
Tchaikovsky: Symphony No. 6, "Pathétique"
Wagner: Prelude and Liebestodt from Tristan und Isolde

Sheffield Lab Records
Debussy: Prélude à l'après-midi d'un faune
Prokofiev:  Suite from Romeo & Juliet
Stravinsky: Suite, The Firebird
Wagner: Ride of the Valkyries; Prelude to Tristan und Isolde; Siegfried's Funeral Music; Forest Murmurs

Jesús López-Cobos

Musical Heritage Society
Goldmark:  Rustic Wedding Symphony, Op. 26 (Ländliche Hochzeit)

Neville Marriner

Yarlung Records
Mozart:  Violin Concerto No. 5 (Martin Chalifour, violin)

Zubin Mehta

Atlantic/WEA
"The 3 Tenors in Concert 1994" (with the Los Angeles Music Center Opera Chorus)

Ernesto De Curtis:  "Non ti scordar di me" (Luciano Pavarotti, tenor)
De Curtis:  "Tu, ca nun chiagne!" (José Carreras, tenor)
Agustín Lara:  "Granada" (Plácido Domingo, tenor)
Leoncavallo:  Pagliacci, "Vesti la Giubba" (Plácido Domingo, tenor)
Massenet:  Le Cid: "O Souverain, Ô Juge, Ô Père"  (José Carreras, tenor)
Massenet:  Werther, " Pourquoi Me Réveiller" (Luciano Pavarotti, tenor)
Puccini:  Turandot, "Nessun Dorma" (Luciano Pavarotti, tenor)
Richard Rodgers:  Spring Is Here, "With a Song in My Heart" (José Carreras, tenor)
Federico Moreno Torroba:  Maravilla, "Amor, Vida De Mi Vida" (Plácido Domingo, tenor)

RCA Red Seal 
Beethoven: Violin Concerto (Pinchas Zukerman, violin)
Brahms: Violin Concerto in D, Op. 77 (Pinchas Zukerman, violin)
Respighi:  Feste Romane (Roman Festivals)
Richard Strauss:  Don Juan, Op. 20

Cambria
Kraft:  Concerto for Four Percussionists & Orchestra (Charles DeLancey, Forrest Clark, William Kraft, Walter Goodwin, percussionists)
Kraft:  Contextures: Riots - Decade '60

London/Decca
Beethoven: Piano Concerto No. 5 in E-flat, Op. 73, "Emperor" (Alicia de Larrocha, piano)
Bernstein:  Overture, Candide
Bizet:  Preludes to Acts 1 and 4, Carmen
Bruckner:  Symphony No. 4, "Romantic"
Bruckner:  Symphony No. 8
Copland:  Suite, Appalachian Spring
Copland:  Fanfare for the Common Man
Copland:  Lincoln Portrait (Gregory Peck, Narrator)
Dvořák: Carnival Overture
Dvořák: Symphony No. 8
Dvořák: Symphony No. 9, "From the New World"
Elgar:  Variations on an Original Theme (Enigma), Op. 36
Gershwin:  An American in Paris
Haydn:  Concerto for Trumpet and Orchestra in E-flat Major (Thomas Stevens, trumpet)
Holst:  The Planets, Op 32 (Women of the Los Angeles Master Chorale)
Ives:  Decoration Day
Ives:  Symphony No. 1
Ives:  Symphony No. 2
Ives:  Variations on America
Kraft: Concerto for Four Percussion Soloists and Orchestra
Liszt:  Battle of the Huns
Liszt:  Orpheus
Liszt:  Mazeppa
Mahler:  Rückert-Lieder (Marilyn Horne, mezzo-soprano)
Mahler:  Songs of a Wayfarer (Marilyn Horne, mezzo-soprano)
Mahler: Symphony No. 3 (Maureen Forrester, contralto; Women of the Los Angeles Master Chorale; California Boys Choir)
Mahler: Symphony No. 5
Mahler:  Adagio from Symphony No. 10
Mozart:  Overture, Le nozze di Figaro
Mussorgsky:  Pictures at an Exhibition (orch. Ravel)
Nielsen:  Symphony No. 4, "Inextinguishable"
Ravel:  Bolero
Ravel:  Daphnis and Chloé, Suite No. 2
Ravel:  La Valse
Ravel:  Ma Mère l'Oye
Rimsky-Korsakov:  Scheherazade (Sidney Harth, violin)
Rossini: Overture, La gazza ladra
Saint-Saëns: Symphony No. 3, "Organ" (Anita Priest, organ)
Schoenberg: Chamber Symphony, Op. 9
Schoenberg: Variations for Orchestra, Op. 31
Scriabin:  Symphony No. 4, The Poem of Ecstasy
Schoenberg:  Verklärte Nacht
Johann Strauss, Jr.:  Overture, Die Fledermaus
Richard Strauss:  Also sprach Zarathustra, Op. 30
Richard Strauss:  An Alpine Symphony, Op. 64
Richard Strauss:  Don Quixote, Op. 35 (Kurt Reher, Cello; Jan Hlinka, Viola)
Richard Strauss:  Ein Heldenleben, Op. 40 (David Frisina, Violin)
Richard Strauss:  Sinfonia Domestica, Op. 53
Stravinsky:  Circus Polka
Stravinsky:  Petrushka
Stravinsky:  The Rite of Spring
Tchaikovsky:  Fantasy Overture, Romeo and Juliet
Tchaikovsky:  Slavonic March, Op. 31
Tchaikovsky:  Solemn Overture, 1812
Tchaikovsky:  Symphony No. 1 in G minor, Op. 13 – "Winter Reveries"
Tchaikovsky:  Symphony No. 2 in C Minor, Op. 17 – "Little Russian"
Tchaikovsky:  Symphony No. 3 in D, Op. 29 - "Polish"
Tchaikovsky:  Symphony No. 4 in F Minor, Op. 36
Tchaikovsky:  Symphony No. 5 in E Minor, Op. 64
Tchaikovsky:  Symphony No. 6 in B Minor, Op. 74 – "Pathetique"
Varèse: Arcana
Varèse: Intégrales
Varèse: Ionisation
Verdi: Four Sacred Pieces (Yvonne Minton, mezzo-soprano; Los Angeles Master Chorale)
Verdi: Overture, La forza del destino
Vivaldi:  Piccolo Concerto in A minor, P.83 (Miles Zentner, piccolo)
Franz von Suppé: Overture, Poet and Peasant
Wagner:  Overture, Rienze
Weber:  Overture, Der Freischütz
Weber:  Clarinet Concertino, Op. 26 (Michele Zukovsky, clarinet)
Wieniawski:  Polonaise de Concert, Op. 4 (Glenn Dicterow, violin)
Wieniawski:  Scherzo-Tarentelle, Op. 16 (Glenn Dicterow, violin)
Williams:  Excerpts from Close Encounters of the Third Kind
Williams:  Star Wars Suite

Myto Records — recorded live in the Dorothy Chandler Pavilion (Nov 14, 1967)
Verdi:  Messa da Requiem (Gwyneth Jones, soprano; Grace Bumbry, mezzo-soprano; Franco Corelli, tenor; Ezio Flagello, baritone; Los Angeles Master Chorale)

Sony Classical
Bartók: Violin Concerto No. 2
Bruch: Violin Concerto No. 1 (Pinchas Zukerman, violin)
Lalo: Symphonie espagnole, for violin and orchestra in D minor, Op. 21  (Pinchas Zukerman, violin)

David Alan Miller

Harmonia Mundi
Powell: Duplicates: A Concerto for Two Pianos (Alan Feinberg and Robert Taub, pianos) (recorded live at the Los Angeles Music Center, January 28, 1990)
Powell:  Setting for Two Pianos (Bryan Pezzone and Trina Dye, pianos)
Powell:  Modules:  An Intermezzo for Chamber Orchestra

Stu Phillips

Intrada
Phillips: Original Television Soundtrack, Battlestar Galactica:  Volume 1, "Saga of the Worlds"

André Previn

Elektra/Nonesuch
Kraft: Contextures II: The Final Beast (Mary Rawcliffe, soprano; Jonathan Mack, tenor; New Albion Ensemble; Pasadena Boys Choir)

New World Records
Harbison:  Concerto for Double Brass Choir and Orchestra
Shapero:  Symphony for Classical Orchestra
Shapero:  Nine Minute Overture

Philips Classics
Debussy:  Prélude à l'après-midi d'un faune (Janet Ferguson, flute)
Dukas:  L'Apprenti sorcier
Glinka: Overture, Russlan and Ludmilla
Ibert, Escales
Mussorgsky: Night on Bald Mountain
Prokofiev:  Scythian Suite, for orchestra, Op. 20
Prokofiev: Symphony No. 1, "Classical"
Prokofiev: Symphony No. 5
Prokofiev: Symphony No. 6
Prokofiev: Symphony No. 7, Op. 131
Prokofiev Symphony-Concerto Op. 125 for Cello and Orchestra (Heinrich Schiff, cello)
Ravel: Daphnis and Chloé, Suite No. 2 (Anne Diener Giles, flute)
Smetana: The Moldau
Tchaikovsky:  Fantasy Overture, Romeo and Juliet

Telarc Records 
Bartók: Concerto for Orchestra
Dvořák: Carnival Overture, Op. 92
Dvořák: Nocturne for string orchestra in B major (arr. from Str. Qrt. No. 4 & Str. Qnt. B. 49), B. 47 (Op. 40)
Dvořák: Overture, My Home, Op. 62
Dvořák: Scherzo Capriccioso, Op. 88
Dvořák: Symphony No. 7
Dvořák: Symphony No. 8
Dvořák: Symphony No. 9, Op. 95, "From the New World"
Janáček: Sinfonietta
Prokofiev: Alexander Nevsky (Christine Cairns, mezzo-soprano; Los Angeles Master Chorale)
Prokofiev: Suite, Lieutenant Kijé

Simon Rattle

EMI Classics
Rachmaninov:  Symphony No. 2 in E minor, Op. 27

David Robertson

Canary Classics
Mackey:  Stumble to Grace (Orli Shaham, piano)

Cantaloupe Music
Gordon:  Dystopia

Artur Rodziński

Eklipse
Beethoven:   ... Per pietà, non dirmi addio", scena and aria for soprano & orchestra, Op. 65 (Stella Roman, soprano)
Giordano:  Andrea Chénier, "La mamma morta" (Stella Roman, soprano)
Korngold:  Die tote Stadt, Op. 12, "Glück das mir verblieb" (Stella Roman, soprano)
Puccini:  Manon Lescaut, "In quelle trine morbide" (Stella Roman, soprano)
Puccini:  Tosca, "Vissi d'arte" (Stella Roman, soprano)
Verdi:  La forza del destino, "Pace, Pace, mio Dio!" (Stella Roman, soprano)

Esa-Pekka Salonen

Deutsche Grammophon
Bartók: Suite, The Miraculous Mandarin
Mussorgsky: St. John's Night on the Bare Mountain (original version)
Salonen:   Helix
Salonen:   Piano Concerto (Yefim Bronfman, piano)
Shostakovich (orchestration by Gerard McBurney):  Prologue to Orango—Ryan McKinny (Veselchak, bass-baritone), Jordan Bisch (Voice from the Crowd/Bass, bass), Michael Fabiano (Zoologist, tenor), Eugene Brancoveanu (Orango, baritone), Yulia Van Doren (Susanna, soprano), Timur Bekbosunov (Paul Mash, tenor), Los Angeles Master Chorale (Grant Gershon, Music Director) (world premiere recording)
Shostakovich:  Symphony No. 4 in C minor, Op. 43
Stravinsky: The Rite of Spring

DG Concerts — recorded live at Walt Disney Concert Hall
Beethoven:  Symphony No. 5
Beethoven:  Symphony No. 7
Beethoven:  Symphony No. 8
Beethoven:  Overture, Leonore No. 2
Debussy: La Mer
Falla:  El amor brujo
Anders Hillborg:  Eleven Gates (world premiere recording)
Hindemith:  Symphonic Metamorphoses on Themes of Weber
Husa:  Music for Prague 1968
Ligeti:  Concert românesc
Lutosławski: Concerto for Orchestra
Lutosławski: Symphony No. 4
Mosolov:  Iron Foundry
Pärt: Symphony No. 4, "Los Angeles" (world premiere recording)
Prokofiev:  Suite from Romeo & Juliet
Ravel:  Ma Mère l'Oye
Ravel: Piano Concerto for the Left Hand in D (Jean-Yves Thibaudet, piano)
Salonen:   Helix
Sibelius:  Symphony No. 2 in D major for orchestra, Op. 43
Shostakovich:  Music from Lady Macbeth of Mtensk District
Shostakovich:  Suite from The Nose
Stravinsky: The Firebird
Wagner:  Die Meistersinger von Nürnberg, Prelude
Wagner:  Die Meistersinger von Nürnberg, "Was duftet doch der Flieder" (Bryn Terfel, bass-baritone)
Wagner:  Die Walküre, The Ride of the Valkyries
Wagner:  Die Walküre, Wotan's Farewell and Magic Fire Music  (Bryn Terfel, bass-baritone)
Wagner:  Lohengrin, Prelude to Act III
Wagner:  Tannhäuser, "O du, mein holder Abendstern" (Bryn Terfel, bass-baritone)

ECM
Pärt: Symphony No. 4, "Los Angeles"

Nonesuch
Adams: Naïve and Sentimental Music

Ondine
Saariaho: Du cristal ... 
Saariaho: ... à la fumée (Petri Alanko, alto flute; Anssi Karttunen, cello)

Philips Classics
Bartók: Violin Concerto No. 2 (Viktoria Mullova, violin)
Stravinsky: Violin Concerto (Viktoria Mullova, violin)

Sony Classical
Bach: Transcriptions (by Elgar, Mahler, Schoenberg, Stokowski, Webern)
Bartók: Concerto for Orchestra
Bartók: Music for Strings, Percussion, and Celesta
Bartók: Concerto for Piano No. 1, Sz. 83 (Yefim Bronfman, piano)
Bartók: Concerto for Piano No. 2, Sz. 95 (Yefim Bronfman, piano)
Bartók: Concerto for Piano No. 3, Sz. 119 (Yefim Bronfman, piano)
Bruckner: Symphony No. 4, "Romantic"
Debussy:  Prélude à l'après-midi d'un faune (Janet Ferguson, flute)
Debussy: La Mer
Debussy:  Images pour orchestre
Debussy: Trois nocturnes (Women of the Los Angeles Master Chorale)
Debussy:  Le martyre de St. Sébastien (Fragments symphoniques)
Debussy:  La Damoiselle élue (Dawn Upshaw, soprano; Paula Rasmussen, mezzo-soprano; Women of the Los Angeles Master Chorale)
Goldmark: Concerto for Violin and Orchestra (Joshua Bell, violin)
Hermann:  Excerpts, Torn Curtain
Hermann:  Overture, North by Northwest
Hermann:  Prelude, The Man Who Knew Too Much
Hermann: Suite, Psycho
Hermann:  Suite, Marnie
Hermann:  Suite, Vertigo
Hermann:  Suite, Fahrenheit 451
Hermann:  Suite, Taxi Driver
Hindemith:  Mathis der Maler (symphony)
Hindemith:  Symphonic Metamorphosis on Themes of Weber
Hindemith:  The Four Temperaments (Emanuel Ax, piano)
Lutosławski:  Symphony No. 1
Lutosławski:  Symphony No. 2
Lutosławski:  Symphony No. 3
Lutosławski:  Symphony No. 4
Lutosławski:  Piano Concerto (Paul Crossley, piano)
Lutosławski:  Chantefleurs et Chantefables (Dawn Upshaw, soprano)
Lutosławski:  Fanfare for Los Angeles Philharmonic
Lutosławski: Les Espaces du sommeil (John Shirley-Quirk, baritone)
Mahler: Symphony No. 3 (Anna Larsson, contralto; Ralph Sauer, trombone; Donald Green, posthorn; Martin Chalifour, violin; Paulist Boy Choristers of California, 	Women of the Los Angeles Master Chorale)
Mahler: Symphony No. 4 (Barbara Hendricks, soprano)
Mahler: Das Lied von der Erde (Plácido Domingo, tenor; Bo Skovhus, baritone)
Marsalis: All Rise (Wynton Marsalis, trumpet; Lincoln Center Jazz Orchestra; Paul Smith Singers; Northridge Singers of California State University; Morgan State University Choir)
Prokofiev: Violin Concertos Nos. 1 and 2 (Cho-Liang Lin, violin)
Revueltas:  Homenaje a Federico García Lorca
Revueltas:  La noche de los mayas
Revueltas:  Ocho por radio
Revueltas:  Sensemayá
Revueltas:  Ventanas for Large Orchestra
Revueltas:  First Little Serious Piece
Revueltas:  Second Little Serious Piece
Salonen:   Cello Concerto (Yo-Yo Ma, cello)
Salonen:   Gambit
Salonen:   Giro
Salonen:   LA Variations
Shostakovich: Piano Concerto No. 1 (Yefim Bronfman, piano; Thomas Stevens, trumpet)
Shostakovich: Piano Concerto No. 2 (Yefim Bronfman, piano)
Sibelius: Concerto for Violin and Orchestra (Joshua Bell, violin)
Sibelius:  En saga
Sibelius: Kullervo Symphony, Op. 7 (Marianna Rorholm, mezzo-soprano; Jorma Hynninen, baritone; Helsinki University Men's Chorus)
Sibelius: Lemminkäinen Legends, Op 22 (Four Legends from the Kalevala)
Stravinsky: Violin Concerto (Cho-Liang Lin, violin)

Zappa Records
Frank Zappa:  200 Motels:  The Suites (Los Angeles Master Chorale:  Grant Gershon, Music Director)

Calvin Simmons

New World Records
Carpenter: Krazy Kat
Gilbert: The Dance in Place Congo
Powell: Rhapsodie Nègre (Zita Carno, piano)

William Steinberg

Cembal D'amour
Tchaikovsky:  Violin Concerto in D major, Op. 35 (Jascha Heifetz, violin)

Leopold Stokowski

EMI Classics/Seraphim
Holst: The Planets, Op. 32 (Women of the Roger Wagner Chorale)

Igor Stravinsky

Deutsche Grammophon
Smith (arr: Stravinsky): "The Star-Spangled Banner"
Stravinsky:  Divertimento from Le Baiser de la fée (The Fairy's Kiss)
Stravinsky:  Scene 4 from Petrushka

Michael Tilson Thomas

Sony Classical
Bernstein:  Music from Mass (Peter Hofmann, Deborah Sasson)
Bernstein:  Music from On the Town (Peter Hoffman, Deborah Sasson)
Bernstein:  Music from West Side Story (Peter Hoffman, Deborah Sasson)
Gershwin: Rhapsody in Blue (Michael Tilson Thomas, pianist)
Gershwin: Second Rhapsody, for piano & orchestra, Rhapsody in Rivets (Michael Tilson Thomas, pianist)
Gershwin: For Lily Pons, for piano (Gershwin Melody No. 79, realized by Michael Tilson Thomas)
Gershwin: Promenade, for piano or orchestra (arrangement of "Walking the Dog" from Shall we Dance, film)
Gershwin:  Gershwin Live! (Recorded live at the Music Center) (Sarah Vaughan, vocal soloist, Michael Tilson Thomas and pianist). With An American in Paris, Rhapsody in Blue, etc.
Prokofiev:  The Love for Three Oranges, suite for orchestra, Op. 33 bis
Prokofiev:  Lieutenant Kijé, film score and suite for orchestra, Op. 60
Prokofiev:  Overture in B-flat major, Op 42 "American"
Prokofiev:  Music from Cinderella, Op 87
Respighi:  Fountains of Rome
Respighi:  Roman Festivals
Tchaikovsky: Suite for Orchestra no 3 in G major, Op. 55

Eduard van Beinum

Deutsche Grammophon
Andriessen:  Symphonic Etude
Ravel:  La Valse

Alfred Wallenstein

Angel Records
Brahms:  Symphony No. 2 in D, Op. 73

Historical Recordings appearing on multiple labels (AURA CLASSICS, Ital Disc Inst)
Franck:  Symphonic Variations (Arturo Benedetti Michelangeli, piano)

Clarion
Monteverdi:  Magnificat I, for 7 voices, 9 winds, 2 violins & cembalo (from Vespers), SV 206/8 (Anita Priest; The Roger Wagner Chorale)
Respighi:  Lauda per la Natività del Signore, for soloists, chorus & ensemble, P. 166 (Marie Gibson, soprano; Marilyn Horne, mezzo-soprano; Charles Bressler, tenor; The Roger Wagner Chorale)

Deutsche Grammophon
Beethoven:  Piano Concerto No. 4 (Arthur Rubenstein, piano)

Doremi Records
Paganini:  Violin Concerto No.1 in E flat major (usually transposed to D major), Op. 6, MS 21 (Zino Francescatti, violin)

Eklipse
Wagner:  Tristan und Isolde:   "Wie Lachend Sie Mir Lieder Singen" (Helen Traubel, soprano)

EMI Classics/Seraphim
Rachmaninov: Piano Concerto No. 2 (Leonard Pennario, piano)
Rachmaninov:  Symphony No. 2

Past Classics
Mozart:  Symphony No. 35 in D Major (Haffner), K.385

RCA VICTOR
Bach:  Violin Concerto No. 1 in A minor, BMW 1041 (Jascha Heifetz, violin)
Bach:  Violin Concerto No. 2 in E, BMW 1042 (Jascha Heifetz, violin)
Brahms:  Hungarian Dances (21) for orchestra, WoO 1 No 7 (Jascha Heifetz, violin)
Castelnuovo-Tedesco:  Concerto for violin & orchestra No. 2, Op 66 "I Profeti" (Jascha Heifetz, violin)
Chopin:  Piano Concerto No. 1 in E minor, Op. 11 (Arthur Rubinstein, piano)
Chopin:  Piano Concerto No. 2 in F minor, Op. 21 (Arthur Rubinstein, piano)
Korngold:  Violin Concerto in D major, Op. 35 (Jascha Heifetz, violin)
Ravel: Tzigane, rhapsodie de concert (Jascha Heifetz, violin; Stanley Chaloupka, harp)
Sinding: Suite for violin & orchestra in A Minor, Op 10 ("Suite in the Old Style") (Jascha Heifetz, violin)
Szymanowski:  Symphonie Concertante, Op. 60 (Arthur Rubinstein, piano)
Tchaikovsky:  Sérénade mélancolique, for violin & orchestra (or piano) in B-flat minor, Op. 26 (Jascha Heifetz, violin)

Simax
Beethoven:  "Ah! perfido! . . . Per pietà, non dirmi addio", scena and aria for soprano & orchestra, Op. 65 (Kirsten Flagstad, soprano)

Bruno Walter

Historical recordings appearing on multiple labels (Ital Disc Inst, Eklipse Records, Enterprise, Grammofono 2000, Historical Performers, Urania)
Berlioz:  La Damnation de Faust ("légende dramatique") H. 111 (Op. 24) Suite
Brahms:  Schicksalslied, Op.54
Mozart:  German Dances for Orchestra, K. 605
Mozart:  Piano Concerto No. 23 in A, K. 488 (Leon Fleischer, piano)
Johann Strauss, Jr.:  Overture, Der Zigeunerbaron
Johann Strauss, Jr.:  G'schichten Aus Dem Wienerwald, Op.325
Richard Strauss:  Till Eulenspiegels lustige Streiche (Till Eulenspiegel's Merry Pranks), tone poem for orchestra, Op. 28 (TrV 171)
Tchaikovsky:  Fantasy Overture, Romeo and Juliet
Richard Wagner:  Siegfried Idyll
Weber:  Invitation to the Dance, Op. 65 (orch. BERLIOZ)
Weber:  Konzertstück, Op. 79 (Paulina Carter, piano)
Weber:  Overture, Oberon
Weber:  Overture, Der Freischütz

Pinchas Zukerman (conductor and violin)

Deutsche Grammophon
Bach: The Six Brandenburg Concertos
Haydn:  Sinfonia Concertante in B-flat, H.I. 105 (Ronald Leonard, cello; Barbara Winters, oboe; David Breidenthal, bassoon)
Haydn:  Violin Concerto in C, H.VIIa No.1

Sony Classical
Mozart:  Serenade No. 12 for winds in C minor ("Nacht Musique"), K. 388 (K. 384a)
Mozart:  Serenade No. 7 for orchestra in D major ("Haffner"), K. 250 (K. 248b)
Vivaldi: Violin Concerto in A Minor, RV 356

References

External links
 Los Angeles Philharmonic official website
 Los Angeles Philharmonic Association official website
 Hollywood Bowl official website

Classical music in the United States
Orchestra discographies
Discographies of American artists